Carlos Becerra may refer to:

 Carlos Becerra (politician), Argentine politician
 Carlos Becerra (cyclist) (born 1982), Colombian cyclist
 Carlos Becerra (actor) (born 1991), American actor, producer and entrepreneur
 Carlos Pano Becerra (born 1959), Mexican politician 
 Carlos Santana Becerra (1908–1971), Puerto Rico Supreme Court judge